Charles Errard the Younger (1606–25 May 1689) was a French painter, architect and engraver, co-founder and later director of the Académie Royale de Peinture et de Sculpture.  In 1666 Louis XIV's minister Jean-Baptiste Colbert sent him to found the Académie de France à Rome (French Academy in Rome), where he was director until 1684 (apart from 1673 to 1675, when he was replaced by Noël Coypel).

Biography
Born in Nantes, Charles Errard was trained as a painter by his father, Charles Errard the Elder, a court painter to Louis XIII.  The son's long career as an artist in France was interrupted by several stays in Rome, going there to study with his father in 1625, equipped with a royal scholarship, and again in 1627.  He drew ancient works of art as well as figures, busts, reliefs, ornament and Trajan's Column, as well as contemporary buildings. Soon he became a brilliant draughtsman. He became acquainted with Poussin and his patron Cassiano dal Pozzo, for whom he painted two pictures.

After his return to Paris in 1643, he worked for different French art lovers and collectors including, among others, the brothers Paul Fréart de Chantelou and Roland Fréart de Chambray.

In 1648, Errard was one of the founders of the Académie Royale de Peinture et de Sculpture (French Royal Academy of Painting and Sculpture) and was elected as one of the original twelve elders in charge of its running.

In 1651, according to Stiche, he produced illustrations after Poussin's sketches to Leonardo da Vinci's Trattato della Pittura.  After his appointment as decorator of the royal palace, he received orders for the decoration of the Louvre Palace, the Palace of Fontainebleau (queen mother's suite), Saint-Germain-en-Laye and Versailles.  He was also active as a scenery painter for the royal opera.

As an engraver, he illustrated, among other things, the Vite by Giovanni Pietro Bellori and an anatomical Atlas for the scholars of the French Academy in Rome, one of the first anatomical books for artists  generally. In 1664–65 he carried out an art-collecting trip to Flanders on the king's behalf.

Rivalries with Charles Le Brun led him to take another trip to Rome, this time taking twelve scholars with him to establish the Académie de France à Rome on behalf of his promoter, the French minister Colbert.  He was selected from 1673 and 1675 to be the Principal of the Accademia di San Luca. From 1675 to 1683 Errard was officially the director of the Académie Royale de Peinture et de Sculpture, but his absence from Paris meant that Le Brun was  de facto performing the role. After the death of Colbert in 1683, Errard resigned his offices.

On his death in Rome aged 82, he was buried in Santa Trinità dei Monti.  He left Louis XIV bronze copies of Florentine sculptures, particularly (but not only) from Michelangelo's sculptures in the Medici Chapel – these are now in the Louvre.

References

External links
 La Tribune de l'Art

1606 births
1689 deaths
Artists from Nantes
17th-century French engravers
Members of the Académie royale de peinture et de sculpture
French Baroque painters
17th-century French painters
French male painters
17th-century French architects
Architects from Nantes